The 1991 Cork Senior Football Championship was the 103rd staging of the Cork Senior Football Championship since its establishment by the Cork County Board in 1887. The draw for the opening fixtures took place on 16 December 1990. The championship ran from 20 April to 6 October 1991.

Duhallow entered the championship as the defending champions.

The final was played on 6 October 1991 at Páirc Uí Chaoimh in Cork, between Duhallow and St. Finbarr's, in what was their third ever meeting in the final and their second meeting in succession. Duhallow won the match by 0-11 to 0-10 to claim their third championship title overall and a second title in succession..

University College Cork's Maurice Fitzgerald was the championship's top scorer with 2-16.

Team changes

To Championship

Promoted from the Cork Intermediate Football Championship
 Macroom

From Championship

Regraded to the Cork Intermediate Football Championship
 Rockchapel

Results

First round

Second round

Quarter-finals

Semi-finals

Final

Championship statistics

Top scorers

Overall

In a single game

References

Cork Senior Football Championship